Kaushalya Nagar is a village located in Rangat tehsil. Habitat majority possessed by Bengalis. Its pin code is 744205. The population is considered as Other Backward Class.

Villages in North and Middle Andaman district